Kahawatta Divisional Secretariat is a  Divisional Secretariat  of Ratnapura District, of Sabaragamuwa Province, Sri Lanka.

Kahawatta is one of the seventeen divisions in the Ratnapura District and has 21 Grama Niladhari divisions, the largest of which is Wellandura and Yainna.

References
 Divisional Secretariats Portal

Divisional Secretariats of Ratnapura District